California State Prison, Los Angeles County (LAC) is a male-only state prison located in the city of Lancaster, in Los Angeles County, California. The only state prison located in the county, it is also referenced as Los Angeles County State Prison, CSP-Los Angeles County, and CSP-LAC.  Only occasionally is the prison referred to as Lancaster State Prison, which was particularly avoided in 1992 partly to ease the stigma for Lancaster.

Facilities
As of Fiscal Year 2006/2007, LAC had a total of 1,519 staff and an annual operating budget of $100 million. As of September 2007, it had a design capacity of 2,300 but a total institution population of 4,976, for an occupancy rate of 216.3 percent.

As of April 30, 2020, LAC was incarcerating people at 137.3% of its design capacity, with 3,158 occupants.

LAC's  include the following facilities:

 Level I housing: Open dormitories without a secure perimeter
 Level IV housing: Cells, fenced or walled perimeters, electronic security, more staff and armed officers both inside and outside the installation
 Reception Center (RC): provides short term housing to process, classify and evaluate incoming inmates

History
Before the prison opened in 1993, Los Angeles County hosted no prisons but accounted for forty percent of California's state-prison inmates. "Most of Lancaster's civic leaders and residents" opposed the building of the prison, and four inmates escaped from LAC in its first year of operation. Nevertheless, by 2000 city residents' opinions of the prison had improved so much that a proposal to increase the proportion of maximum-security inmates received little criticism.

A 2006–2007 conversion "of roughly half of" LAC's facilities decreased the number of maximum-security inmates and increased the number of reception center inmates. Since reception center inmates are at the prison for shorter times than maximum-security inmates, the conversion may "reduce the number of families that will relocate to the region to be near a family member who is in the prison" and "reduce the number of prisoners who will want to relocate to the area after serving their sentences or after being released on parole".

During the COVID-19 pandemic, an inmate at California State Prison in Lancaster, was placed in isolation. On March 19, 2020, he reported that he was not feeling well. The agency said the patient was tested the following day and the results were received Sunday.

In March 2021, Canadian singer Justin Bieber visited the prison with his wife Hailey and pastor Judah Smith at the invitation of Scott Budnick. Justin Bieber spoke to inmates about their faith and listened to their stories. In a statement on April 1, 2021, Bieber recounted his visit, saying "It was such an honor listening to their stories and seeing how strong their faith is."

Notable inmates

Current
 Joe Son: Actor and former mixed martial artist.
 Kori Ali Muhammad: Perpetrator of the 2017 Fresno shootings.

Former
 Loi Khac Nguyen: One of the perpetrators of the 1991 Sacramento hostage crisis for which he was convicted of killing three people.
 Big Lurch: Rapper and convicted murderer.
 Robert John Bardo: Murdered actress Rebecca Schaeffer in 1989.
 Lawrence Phillips: Former professional football player.
 Rene Enriquez: Mobster.
 Robert Rozier: Former American football defensive end.
 Craig Coley: Wrongfully convicted of the 1978 murder of his ex girlfriend and her son before being pardoned and exonerated by CA governor Jerry Brown in 2017.
 Samuel Little: Serial killer convicted of killing eight women, though he is suspected of killing as many as 90 in total.

See also 
 List of California state prisons

References

External links
 California Department of Corrections and Rehabilitation Official website
 California State Prison, Los Angeles County—California Department of Corrections
 Aerial view of the prison

1993 establishments in California
Buildings and structures in Los Angeles County, California
Buildings and structures in Lancaster, California
Prisons in California